Ultimatum EP 1.0 is the second EP by SMP, self-released in 1997.

Track listing

Personnel
Adapted from the Ultimatum EP 1.0 liner notes.

SMP
 Jason Bazinet – lead vocals, drums, drum programming
 Xian Di Marris – drums

Additional performers
 Mike Ditmore – drums, drum programming

Release history

References

External links 
 
 Ultimatum (Catastrophe Version) at iTunes

1997 EPs
SMP (band) albums